Moquah is an unincorporated community in the town of Pilsen, Bayfield County, Wisconsin, United States. The community name derives from Algonquian for "bear".

Images

References

Unincorporated communities in Bayfield County, Wisconsin
Unincorporated communities in Wisconsin